Petter Vennerød (25 September 1948 – 19 September 2021) was a Norwegian film director, known for his cooperation with Svend Wam, creating fourteen films under the moniker Wam og Vennerød.

He was a son of film director Øyvind Vennerød, and brother of economist Christian Vennerød.

Filmography
 Fem døgn i august (1973)
 Lasse og Geir (1976, re-released 2007)
 Det tause flertall (1977)
 Hvem har bestemt? (1978)
 Svartere enn natten (1979)
 Liv og død (1980)
 Julia Julia (1981)
 Leve sitt liv (1982)
 Åpen framtid (1983, re-released 2007)
 Adjø solidaritet (1985, re-released 2007)
 Hotel St. Pauli (1988)
 Drømmeslottet (1986, re-released 2007)
 Bryllupsfesten (1989, re-released 2007)
 Lakki (1992)
 Sebastian (1995)

References

External links

1948 births
2021 deaths
Norwegian film directors
Film people from Oslo